is the thirteenth studio album by the Japanese girl group Morning Musume. It was released on September 12, 2012.

Background 
It is the first album to feature tenth generation members Haruna Iikubo, Ayumi Ishida, Masaki Sato and Haruka Kudo and the last album to feature sixth generation member Reina Tanaka.

The album was released in two versions: Limited Edition (CD+DVD) and Regular Edition (CD).

Track listing

Charts

References

External links 
 Colorful Character - Oricon

2012 albums
Morning Musume albums
Zetima albums
Japanese-language albums
Albums produced by Tsunku
Electropop albums
Dance-pop albums by Japanese artists